The Badwater Ultramarathon describes itself as "the world's toughest foot race". It takes place annually in mid-July, when the weather conditions are most extreme and temperatures can reach . Consequently, very few people, even among ultramarathoners, are capable of finishing the race.

Course
Originally, the run was conceived as being between the lowest and the highest points in the contiguous United States: Badwater, Death Valley [] and Mt. Whitney's summit []. The two are only eighty miles apart on the map, but the land route between the two points is substantially longer, because of detours around lake beds and over mountain ranges. Due to the two mountain ranges that must be crossed between Badwater and Whitney, the course's cumulative elevation gain exceeds .

Because the United States Forest Service requires permits to climb Mt. Whitney and because of the large number of participants, the official course was shortened to end at Whitney Portal. Forest Service regulations do not allow competitive events in the John Muir Wilderness.

Early history
The first hikes across Death Valley of more than 100 miles took place in 1966, starting with Jean Pierre Marquant of France. Hikes between Badwater and Mount Whitney (via the treacherous salt flats in Death Valley) were first made in 1969 by Stan Rodefer and Jim Burnworth of San Diego.

Al Arnold first attempted running the route in 1974 but was pulled off the course after  with severe dehydration. After vigorous sauna-training and desert-acclimatization, he attempted the run again in 1975. This time, a knee injury aborted the run at fifty miles. In 1976, training injuries kept him from even beginning his annual attempt on the course.

In 1977 he successfully pioneered running the course, summiting Whitney 84 hours after his start at Badwater. Arnold never returned to the course, except to receive the Badwater Hall of Fame Award.

In 1980, Gary Morris of Marina Del Rey, California attempted to beat Arnold's record. When temps hit 120 degrees F, he pulled out and didn't plan to run in 1981. He worked out with Jay Birmingham and Jon Griffin in Marina Del Rey before the attempt, and Jay's run from Los Angeles to New York City.

The second Badwater-to-Whitney running was completed in 1981, by Jay Birmingham.

In 1987, the crossing became an official, organized footrace. Gill Cornell of Ridgecrest California ran the 146 miles in 45 hours and 15 minutes breaking the old record of 56 hours to the top of Whitney. Gill had permits for both Death Valley and Mount Whitney to run his distance. Five other runners competed that year. During the early years of the race, no particular route between Badwater and Whitney was specified and runners attempted various "shortcuts" between the start and finish. Adrian Crane, one of the competitors in the inaugural race, even used cross-country skis to cross the salt-flats at Badwater. In 1988 the race was called the Badwater 146 because the finish line was the summit of Mt. Whitney. Since 1989 the race was shortened and it became Badwater 135 since it was impossible to get enough permits to run the last 11 miles up on national forest lands to the top of Whitney from the Portals. So, the official times were faster and the course shorter.

AdventureCORPS Badwater Ultramarathon
Currently, AdventureCORPS manages the competitive race from Badwater to Whitney Portal. The course route is specified, and the race is held annually. The field is invitation-only and limited in size. Demand to participate in the race usually far exceeds available spots. Rules have changed somewhat over the years: afternoon starts have been discontinued; the use of intravenous fluids now disqualifies a runner.

Course support is not provided. Each runner must arrange for his or her own support crew and vehicle. The crew provides their runner with his or her needs, including water, ice, food, gear, pacing, and first aid.

In the past, runners were allowed sixty hours to complete the course, but this has been changed to a 48-hour course limit and a 28 hours cutoff at Panamint Springs Resort. Finishers receive a belt buckle and medal but no prize money is awarded.

The record for the  race was set in 1991 by Marshall Ulrich: 33 hours and 54 minutes. Records for the current  course are 21 hours 33 minutes 01 seconds (men), set by Yoshihiko Ishikawa, and 24 hours 9 minutes 34 seconds (women), set by Ashley Paulson in 2022.

In 2002, Pam Reed was the first woman to become the overall winner of the Badwater Ultramarathon. She subsequently repeated as overall winner of the race in 2003. In 2002, her win also set the women's course record at the time.

In the last few years, about 90 people have competed in each race, with 20–40% failing to reach the finish line. There have been no fatalities.

The 2020 edition of the race was cancelled due to the COVID-19 pandemic, with all 102 confirmed participants guaranteed entry in 2021.

Race winners 

(*) Current course record with night start, effective from 2015.

(**) Course record with day start.

Related events

Multiple crossings
In 1989, Tom Crawford and Richard Benyo completed the first double crossing (which became known as the "Death Valley 300"), running from Badwater to Mount Whitney's summit and back to Badwater again.

In 1994, Scott Weber completed the first Triple Crossing going from the Mount Whitney Summit to Badwater, then returning from Badwater to the Mount Whitney summit, then going from the Mount Whitney summit back to Badwater in 10 days. Faced with the necessity of completing the Triple before August ended, Weber abandoned his cart at mile 390 to be fully crewed by Denise Jones. Completing this Triple and adding the Badwater race from the previous month made Weber the first runner to complete four full crossings of the Badwater-Mount Whitney summit course in a single July–August window.

In 2001, Marshall Ulrich was the first runner to complete the "Badwater Quad", consisting of two back-to-back Death Valley 300s for a total of four consecutive Badwater/Whitney transits. He completed the course, a distance in excess of twenty-two marathons, in ten days.

In 2003, Sawyer Manuj became the first Asian-American to complete the Badwater duo.

In 2012, Terry Abrams (54) became the first woman to complete a solo Triple 146 crossing, 438 miles, which includes two summits of Mt. Whitney. She is also the oldest woman to complete the Double, 292 miles.

In 2014, Lisa Smith-Batchen (54) became the first woman to complete the "Badwater Quad", 584 miles in 15 days.

Unassisted solo crossings
In 1994, Scott Weber became the first runner to cross from the summit of Mount Whitney to Badwater course solo without a crew. He did so by pushing a 'baby-jogger' cart with his supplies going oasis to oasis ( apart). Weber then continued on to complete 2 additional crossing with minimal support until being crewed full-time for the final  of this 438+ mile journey.

Unassisted "self-contained" solo crossings
In July 1999, Marshall Ulrich became the first runner to complete the  Badwater-to-Summit course without a crew or resupply, denying himself the use of artificial shade or outside aid of any kind. He reached Whitney's summit in seventy seven hours and forty six minutes.

In July 2004, Jeff Sauter became the second person to attempt a solo self-contained crossing under Marshall Ulrich's rules, and completed the 135 mile course to Whitney Portal in 72 hours, but succumbed to hypothermia on the way to the summit and failed to finish the 146 mile course.

Ben "Badwater" Jones, the reference authority and person who documents Badwater crossings, documented the following attempts on his website. http://www.badwaterbenjones.com -> Badwater/Mt. Whitney 146.

In July 2011, Lisa Bliss became the first woman and second person to complete the 146 mile Badwater-to-Summit course totally self-contained (without crew or resupply of any kind, abiding by the rules set forth in Marshall Ulrich's 1999 unassisted "self-contained" solo crossing). She pushed and pulled a custom-built 3-wheeled cart filled with water and gear that weighed 240 pounds at the start from Badwater to the Whitney trail head, and then continued the remaining 11 miles to the summit with a pack that she carried from the start. She reached the Mt. Whitney summit in 89 hours and 38 minutes.
 On July 14, 2016, Dusty Hardman became the second woman to complete Badwater 146 in 80 hours and 57 minutes while pushing a modified baby stroller. She pushed the stroller from Badwater Basin to Lone Pine and then carried gear and water to the Whitney Summit from Lone Pine.

In July 2012, "Bogie" Bogdan Dumitrescu made an unsuccessful attempt. In August 2012, Croix Sather got to the Whitney Portal in 64:55 and summited Whitney in 72:55, setting a new record. A subsequent attempt was made by "Bogie" Bogdan Dumitrescu who got to the Whitney Portal in 56:50 and summited Whitney in 70:40. Bogie started on July 8, 2013, at 7:45am, got to the portal at 12:03pm(52:18) and summited Whitney on 7/10/13 at 20:03 in the evening, setting a new time of 60 hours 18 minutes. In 2014 Bogie started on July 1 and had to stop after Townes Pass due to severe dizziness and breathing problems. But he returned two weeks later, and finished with a time of 57 hours 18 minutes.

Badwater Solo Ultra 135/146
Through the years, runners of all abilities have completed individual Badwater to Mt. Whitney crossings in the spirit of the early crossings, usually aided by crew. In 2005, Hugh Murphy initiated an informal gathering known as the Badwater Solo Ultra 135/146. Runners could finish at Whitney Portal (135 mi.), but were encouraged to continue to the summit of Mt. Whitney (146 mi.) Finishers of either distance were presented with a bronze belt buckle. Among the finishers of the 135 mile Badwater Solo in 2005, listed in order of finish time, were Shane Sampson, Juli Aistars, Steve James, Marcia Rassmussen, Jim Hamilton, Maureen Moran, Bo Pheffer, Dharam (Paul) Piplani Barbara Szeprethy and Dave Remington. In 2007, the informal group start was dissolved due to National Park Service permitting regulations. Solo runners continue to complete the course on an individual basis during the months of July and August. The word "solo" is used to designate runners who are not part of the official race. These Solos should not be confused with the unassisted crossings of Ulrich or Weber. In compliance with National Park and Forest Service permitting rules, the Badwater Solo is not a competitive race or an organized event of any kind. In general there are three types of recognized "solos". "Solo badwater" where the runner has a crew. "Solo self supported" or "Solo Oasis to oasis", where the runner does not have a crew but can use/buy/stash water and food. "Solo self contained" where the runner cannot get help and has to carry all food and water (see exact rules established by Marshall Ulrich). Since 2007, Marcia Rasmussen has attempted to award each Solo crossing a buckle for their finish. "Badwater" Ben Jones used to maintain a "Master List" of all Badwater-to-Whitney crossings, including finishers of the official Badwater Ultramarathon and the Badwater Solo. 
 
In 2007, then 19-year-old Ben Eakin – son of Laura Weber and coached and crewed by Scott Weber – completed his first solo crossing, having only finished 2 marathons and 1 50K prior to doing so. Eakin completed the 146 mile solo from Badwater to the summit of Mount Whitney, to become the youngest person to complete the lowest to highest course, as well as the first type-1 diabetic.

In 2005, Barbara Szeprethy, then 24, is the youngest woman to finish the course, 3 times total, in consecutive years.

Death Valley Cup
Any competitor who completes both the Badwater Ultramarathon and the Furnace Creek 508 bicycle race (also held in Death Valley) during the same calendar year is awarded the Death Valley Cup. In 1996, Marshall Ulrich became the first ever to finish the Death Valley Cup.

Charlie Engle currently holds the Death Valley Cup record, setting it in 2009. That year, he ran Badwater, 25:45:11 (4th place) and Furnace Creek, 33:19:25,
(4th place) for a total time of 59:04:36.

Badwater World Cup BWWC
Badwater World Cup (BWWC) consists of
 Badwater (race in the desert)
 Brazil 135 Ultramarathon (race in the mountains)
 Arrowhead 135 (race in the snow)
 Europe 135

See also
Running on the Sun: The Badwater 135, a documentary film on the 1999 race

References

External links

 Badwater 146 info

Official event sites
 AdventureCORPS Badwater Ultramarathon
 Furnace Creek 508

Landmark crossings
Breaking Point and Beyond, reprint of Marathoner Magazine article about Al Arnold's pioneering of the course, 1978.
 My Most Unforgettable Ultramarathon, And What I Learned From It, reprint of Marshall Ulrich's account of his unassisted crossing in Marathon and Beyond.
 Running on the Sun: The Badwater 135. Documentary of the 1999 race
 The Distance of Truth: Documentary of the 2005 race

Badwater World Cup BWWC
 AdventureCORPS Badwater Ultramarathon
 Arrowhead 135 Ultramarathon

Ultramarathons in California
Ultramarathons in the United States
Death Valley
Mojave Desert
Tourist attractions in Inyo County, California
Recurring sporting events established in 1987
1987 establishments in California